The women's 800 metres T34 event at the 2020 Summer Paralympics in Tokyo, took place on 4 September 2021.

Records
Prior to the competition, the existing records were as follows:

Results
The final took place on 4 September 2021, at 9:46:

References

Women's 800 metres T34
2021 in women's athletics